The reyong (also spelled reong) is a musical instrument used in Balinese gamelan. It consists of a long row of metal gongs suspended on a frame. In gamelan gong kebyar, it is played by four players at once, each with two mallets.

Often the individual pots can be removed from the frame and played individually as bonang in beleganjur.

See also

 Gamelan
 Music of Bali

Further reading
 

Indonesian musical instruments
Gongs
Gamelan instruments